Louis Armstrong appeared in a large number of feature-length films and shorts, often as himself.

Incomplete

 Ex-Flame (1930), as Louis Armstrong
 A Rhapsody in Black and Blue (1932 short), as Louis Armstrong
 I'll Be Glad When You're Dead You Rascal You (1932 short), as Louis Armstrong
 København, Kalundborg og - ? (1934), as Louis Armstrong
 Pennies from Heaven (1936), as Henry
 Artists and Models (1937), as Louis Armstrong
 Every Day's a Holiday (1937), as Louis Armstrong
 Doctor Rhythm (1938), as Trumpet Player
 Going Places (1938), as Gabe
 Birth of the Blues (1941), as Louis Armstrong
 Cabin in the Sky (1943), as The Trumpeter
 Show Business at War (1943 documentary short) (uncredited)
 Jam Session (1944) (uncredited)
 Pillow to Post (1945), as Orchestra Leader
 New Orleans (1947)
 A Song Is Born (1948), as Louis Armstrong
 I'm in the Revue (1950), as Band Leader
 Saint-Germain-des-Prés (1950), as Louis Armstrong
 Here Comes the Groom (1951) (uncredited)
 Glory Alley (1952), as Shadow Johnson
 Saluti e baci (1953), as Louis Armstrong
 The Glenn Miller Story (1954), as Louis Armstrong
 High Society (1956), as Louis Armstrong
 The Night Before the Premiere (Die Nacht vor der Premiere) (1959), as Louis Armstrong
 The Five Pennies (1959), as Louis Armstrong
 The Beat Generation (1959), as Louis Armstrong
 La Paloma (1959), as Louis Armstrong
 Kærlighedens melodi (1959), as Musician with Orchestra
 Paris Blues (1961), as Wild Man Moore
 Auf Wiedersehen (1961), as Louis Armstrong
 Berlin-Melodie (1963 TV movie)
 When the Boys Meet the Girls (1965), as Louis Armstrong
 Rhein-Melodie - Wein, Gesang und gute Laune (1966 TV movie)
 A Man Called Adam (1966), as Willie Ferguson
 Hello, Dolly! (1969), as Orchestra Leader

Male actor filmographies
American filmographies